Joseph Henri Joachim, vicomte Lainé (11 November 1768 – 17 December 1835), was a French lawyer and politician.

Born in Bordeaux, he became a successful lawyer in Paris. In 1793 he was named administrator of the district of La Réole, returning to work as a lawyer under the French Directory. In 1808 he became a member of the Legislative Corps; he was again deputy after the Restoration, being chosen as Minister of Interiors between 1816 and 1818.

He died in Paris in 1835.

Unfinished History of France' (Longman, London, 1977 ed. J. Hamburger, pp. 61-2), Thomas B Macaulay, Biographical Glossary, by the editor states thus in addition to the above: 
"In 1813 he criticised Napoleon's failure to seek peace and his mismanagement of the economy,  and this led to his dismissal.  He took part in the royalist rebellion in Bordeaux in March 1814. He was elected president of the Chamber of Deputies in 1814.  During the Hundred Days he emigrated,  returning to preside over the Chamber in 1815, where he was the leader of the right-center faction.  He served as minister of interior under Richelieu and proposed a new electoral law which was intended to weaken the ultras. He was made a peer in 1825 and retired from politics after the July revolution."

In his unfinished 'History of France' (Longman, London, 1977 ed. J. Hamburger, pp. 61-2), Thomas B Macaulay writes of Lainé: "Among the commissioners was a man whose name occupies a conspicuous place in the history of France since the restoration,  - M. Lainé. That statesman has exerted himself with equal zeal on the side of revolution,  and on the side of the counter-revolution; yet malice itself has not ventured to impute any part of his conduct to unworthy motives.  The most skilful delineators of his character have remarked,  that his reason has always been under the tyranny of an irritable,  though a generous, temper; and of a vivid, though not an original,  imagination,  - that whatever is grand or pathetic readily subjugates his mind, - that thus the enthusiasm of loyalty and the enthusiasm of liberty actuate him alternately; that each of these feelings during the period of its dominion almost wholly excludes the other, - and that, like most of those whose opinions are determined not by argument but by taste and feeling,  he is intolerant of contradiction,  and considers it a crime in others to defend against him that which he had himself defended but a short time before,  and which he will soon defend again. Those who have thus represented him have allowed that he is emphatically an honest man; that he has atoned for his extraordinary inconsistency by a still more extraordinary disinterestedness; that even when placed in the most corrupting situations,  and surrounded by the worst and basest allies, he has preserved an independent spirit,  strict morals, simple manners,  the most shining purity of personal honour, a noble contempt of offices, titles, and emoluments,  and a true and fervent love of his country.

"While the power of Napoleon was at its height, M. Lainé had exerted himself to raise an opposition in the legislative body: his efforts had failed.  The recollection of two disastrous campaigns, and the dread of immediate invasion,  now disposed the majority of his colleagues to second his plans. He took upon himself the dangerous office of reporting in the name of the commission.  The language which he employed was such as had not been heard for years from any public man in France.   It was necessary,  he said, that the emperor should declare his intention of respecting the independence of foreign nations,  and that liberty should be restored at home. The assembly resolved,  by a great majority of ballot,  that the report should be printed."

External links
Académie française,
Assemblée nationale.

1767 births
1835 deaths
Politicians from Bordeaux
18th-century French lawyers
Members of the Académie Française
Burials at Père Lachaise Cemetery
19th-century French lawyers